is a Japanese manga artist. He is best known for his manga series Future Diary and Big Order. Esuno started drawing at age 15, at the time he was an admirer of the works of Rumiko Takahashi in particular her horror manga  Mermaid Saga. After working as a manga assistant for many years he managed to become a professional manga artist when his story  won a prize in a contest held by Kadokawa Shoten in 2001.
In the 2017 May issue of Monthly Shōnen Ace magazine, he launched a new manga titled Tantei Akechi wa Kyōran su (The Detective Akechi is Berserk), a tribute to the works of Edogawa Ranpo. The manga ended in the issue published in December 2018. 
In May 2019, he started the serialization of the manga adaptation of Bokuto Uno's light novel series Reign of the Seven Spellblades in Monthly Shōnen Ace.

Works

  (June 2004–November 2005, Monthly Shōnen Ace)
  (January 2006–December 2010, Monthly Shōnen Ace)
  (2008)
  (2008)
  (2013)
  (November 2011–September 2016, Monthly Shōnen Ace)
  (May 2017–December 2018, Monthly Shōnen Ace)
  (May 2019–ongoing, Monthly Shōnen Ace, manga adaptation of the light novel series of the same name by Bokuto Uno)

References 

1973 births
Living people
Manga artists from Shizuoka Prefecture